Križe may refer to:

 Kríže, a village in Slovakia
 Križe, Brežice, a village in Slovenia
 Križe, Novo Mesto, a village in Slovenia
 Križe, Tržič, a village in Slovenia

See also
 Križ (disambiguation)